The 1973 Speedway World Team Cup was the 14th edition of the FIM Speedway World Team Cup to determine the team world champions.

The final took place at Wembley Stadium in London. The title was won by Great Britain for the third consecutive year and fourth time in total. The fourth win drew Britain level with Poland on four titles won but Sweden remained ahead on the number of titles won with six.

Results

World final

See also
 1973 Individual Speedway World Championship
 1973 Speedway World Pairs Championship

References

World Team
Speedway World Team Cup